The 2016–17 RB Leipzig season was the 8th season in the football club's history and 1st ever season in the top flight of German football, the Bundesliga, having been promoted from the 2. Bundesliga in 2016. RB Leipzig also participated in the season's edition of the domestic cup, the DFB-Pokal. The season covers a period from 1 July 2016 to 30 June 2017.

Review

Background
On 6 May 2016, Ralph Hasenhüttl was appointed to replace Ralf Rangnick as the head coach. On 8 May 2016, RB Leipzig was directly promoted to the Bundesliga after securing second position in the 2015–16 2. Bundesliga.

December
On 3 December, Leipzig faced Schalke 04 at home on matchday 13. The match finished as a 2–1 win for RB Leipzig. RBL opened the scoring in the second minute from the penalty spot via Timo Werner. Two minutes later, Yussuf Poulsen missed two opportunities in a row to extend the lead for Leipzig.  Poulsen again missed an opportunity in the 29th minute, missing a metre away from goal. Two minutes later, Sead Kolašinac scored the equaliser for Schalke, after the ball was parried by RB goalkeeper Péter Gulácsi. Two minutes into the second half, Sead Kolašinac scored an own goal from a free kick from Leipzig's Emil Forsberg. Leipzig had further opportunities to score, but failed to capitalise. This includes a chance for Poulsen in the 64th minute from a corner, from Marcel Halstenberg in the 74th minute with a header onto the bar, and two opportunities for Naby Keïta in the 81st and 83rd minute. Leipzig goalkeeper Gulácsi preserved their lead with three consecutive saves in the 77th minute. The final opportunities fell to Poulsen in the 84th minute and Emil Forsberg in the 88th, yet both were unable to extend the lead. This proved to be enough, as Leipzig secured their 8th consecutive victory and maintained their position at the top of the table.

Players

Squad

Transfers

In

Out

Friendly matches

Competitions

Overview

Bundesliga

League table

Results summary

Results by round

Matches

DFB-Pokal

Statistics

Appearances and goals

|-
! colspan=14 style=background:#dcdcdc; text-align:center| Goalkeepers

|-
! colspan=14 style=background:#dcdcdc; text-align:center| Defenders

|-
! colspan=14 style=background:#dcdcdc; text-align:center| Midfielders

|-
! colspan=14 style=background:#dcdcdc; text-align:center| Forwards

|-
! colspan=14 style=background:#dcdcdc; text-align:center| Players transferred out during the season

Goalscorers

Last updated: 20 May 2017

Clean sheets

Last updated: 29 April 2017

Disciplinary record

Last updated: 20 May 2017

References

Leipzig
RB Leipzig seasons